Dorinish (Irish: Deoirinis) is an uninhabited island in Clew Bay in County Mayo, Ireland.

History

John Lennon purchase and Hippie Commune
The island was previously owned by John Lennon, who purchased the island in 1967 for £1,700. Previously used by sailing ships for its stones, the island became a place of peace for Lennon and his family. After his divorce from wife Cynthia, the island went unused until Lennon invited "King of the Hippies" Sid Rawle and Timi Walsh to establish a commune on the island in 1970. For the next two years, a group of roughly 25 hippies called Dorinish home, growing their own vegetables and raising children.

In 1972 a fire burned down the island's supply tent and the commune disbanded. After Lennon's death, Yoko Ono sold the island for nearly £30,000 and donated the proceeds to an Irish orphanage. Dorinish is now used as a grazing site for livestock and is sometimes visited by enthusiastic Beatles fans. An artists' summer school "Aerial Blue" was held on the island in July 2011.

Demographics

See also
 List of islands of County Mayo

References

External links
Westport Residents Reject Hippie Way of Life 1971 - RTE Archives including interview with Sid Rawle
Dorinish: Dot Jarlett archive - excerpts from Sunday Independent and George A. Birmingham on "Inishbawn"
Information on Dorinish
Further Information

Islands of County Mayo
Private islands of Ireland
Uninhabited islands of Ireland
Communes
Intentional communities in Ireland